The 2020 WeatherTech 240 was a sports car race sanctioned by the International Motor Sports Association (IMSA). The race was held at the Daytona International Speedway combined road course in Daytona Beach, Florida on July 4th, 2020. This race was the second round of the 2020 WeatherTech SportsCar Championship, and the first round of the 2020 WeatherTech Sprint Cup.

Taylor and García's GTLM class victory marked the first victory for the new Corvette C8.R, alongside Corvette Racing's 100th win in IMSA competition. The race was also just the 12th caution-free race since the merger in 2014.

Background
The race was the first for the series following the suspension due to the COVID-19 pandemic, and was initially announced to be run behind closed doors. However, it was later announced that a maximum of 5,000 fans were to be admitted, with all required to be residents of the state of Florida. The race was also the first time since 2010 that the WeatherTech SportsCar Championship or its previous series had competed in the Paul Revere 250 Independence Day event.

Entries

A total of 26 cars took part in the event, down from the 39 entries from the season's opening event. There were 8 cars in the DPi class, 6 cars in the GTLM class, and 12 cars in the GTD class. The LMP2 class would not be participating in the event. Paul Miller Racing, the GTD class winner in the Rolex 24, didn't enter the event due to effects of the pandemic. Likewise, Pfaff Motorsports also didn't enter, due to travel restrictions surrounding being based in Canada. The #19 GEAR Racing powered by GRT Grasser entry, the #91 of Wright Motorsports, and the #23 Heart of Racing Team Aston Martin all declined to enter the event as well. Team Hardpoint made their series debut, and Gradient Racing returned for the first time since 2018. 

Prior to the event, Aaron Telitz was announced as the replacement for Parker Chase in the #14 entry for AIM Vasser Sullivan.

Qualifying

Qualifying results

Results
Due to a lightning storm, the race start was delayed. While the race was originally scheduled to end at sunset, a considerable portion of the race ended up running after dark. The race ran full course caution free.

References

External links

WeatherTech 240
WeatherTech 240
WeatherTech 240